Poulain is the French word for foal and is a common French surname. It may refer to:

People
 Amélie Poulain, central character of romantic comedy film Amélie
 Jean-Paul Poulain, a French cabaret singer
 Raphaël Poulain (b. 1980), French rugby player
 Gabriel Poulain, French cyclist (active early 20th century)
 Benoît Poulain (b. 1987), French footballer
 Michel-Marie Poulain (1906-1991), French painter

Other
 Chocolat Poulain, a French chocolate brand
 A twelfth century term designating Latin Christian settlers in the Crusader States of the Middle East. Poulains in this context were the Frankish descendants of those original crusaders who had remained in Palestine after the capture of Jerusalem in 1099.